Atypus karschi is a mygalomorph spider found in Korea, China, Taiwan, and Japan. It has been introduced into the United States.

Like other spiders in its infraorder, it has fangs that point straight down rather than crossing.

This spider has an unusual web. It spins a tube of silk that is hidden partially underground, with the portion above ground being covered in leaves and other debris. The spider waits for an insect to land or crawl onto the tube, then bites through the silk to pull the insect inside.

The specific name honors arachnologist Friedrich Karsch.

References

External links
 
English site with general information on A. karschi

Atypidae
Spiders of Asia
Spiders described in 1887